Kobus or Cobus  is a Dutch and now primarily Afrikaans masculine given name, a short form (hypocorism) of the given name Jacobus. 

People with this name include:

Kobus Brand (born 1994), Namibian cricketer
Cobus de Swardt, South African sociologist
Kobus Jonker, South African paralympic athlete
Cobus Kellermann, South African financial analyst
Kobus Moolman, South African poet
Kobus Marais, South African politician
Cobus Pienaar (born 1985), South African cricketer
Kobus van der Schlossen (died 1695), Dutch legendary thief
Kobus Vandenberg (born 1950), Dutch sports sailor

South African rugby union players:
Kobus de Kock (born 1988)
Cobus Grobbelaar (born 1981)
Kobus Marais (born 1994)
Cobus Reinach (born 1990)
Kobus Van Deventer (born 1995)
Kobus van Dyk (born 1994)
Kobus van Wyk (born 1992)
Cobus Visagie (born 1973)
Kobus Wiese (born 1964)
Cobus Wiese (born 1997)

References

Dutch masculine given names